Villapark is a neighbourhood of Maastricht, Netherlands, located in the city's southwestern part. It is a relatively affluent neighbourhood.

Notable features
 Sint Petrus Church (also called Sint-Pieter beneden), in Neo-Romanesque style

Trivia
 In common parlance, the neighbourhoods of Jekerdal, Villapark and Sint Pieter are all perceived as constituting Sint Pieter.

Impressions

Location

Neighbourhoods of Maastricht